Nancy Kates is an independent filmmaker based in the San Francisco Bay Area. She directed Regarding Susan Sontag, a feature documentary about the late essayist, novelist, director and activist. Through archival footage, interviews, still photographs and images from popular culture, the film reflects the boldness of Sontag’s work and the cultural importance of her thought, and received funding from the National Endowment for the Humanities, the National Endowment for the Arts, the Foundation for Jewish Culture and the Sundance Documentary Film Program.

Kates is best known for her film Brother Outsider: The Life of Bayard Rustin, a full-length documentary she made with co-producer Bennett Singer about Bayard Rustin, the gay civil rights leader. The film premiered on the PBS series POV and at the 2003 Sundance Film Festival, and received numerous awards, including the 2004 GLAAD Media Award and audience awards at the major American gay and lesbian film festivals. It also received the award for best feature film at New York’s New Festival and a number of jury prizes. "In the struggle for African-American dignity, Rustin was perhaps the most critical figure that many people have never heard of," says a review in TIME Magazine, "but neither mainstream society nor even the civil rights leadership could cope with his honesty." Hailed as "marvelous" by The Wall Street Journal, "packed with information" by The New York Times, and "beautifully crafted" by The Boston Globe, the Village Voice commends the film for "vividly bring[ing] back to life a man who deeply and brilliantly influenced the course of the civil rights and peace movements."

In 1995, Kates' master's thesis for Stanford University's film program, Their Own Vietnam, won a Student Academy Award in documentary. The film tells the stories of five American women who served in the Vietnam War, including a couple who met while serving. It presents a complex picture of their identities as women, using archival footage, home movies and snapshots. The film screened at the Sundance Film Festival, South by Southwest Film Festival, the Boston International Festival of Women’s Cinema, and the Minneapolis-St. Paul International Film Festival among others, aired on public television, and received an award of merit from the International Documentary Association / David Wolper Awards. The Journal of American History praised the film, saying that the "complex melding of images from the Vietnam conflict culled from newsreel footage, snapshots, and military recruiting films with the jarringly honest recollections of five female veterans makes this an extremely compelling film," and LA Weekly praised it for its "transformations fraught with anger, pain, unimaginable guilt and sometimes joy - and the honesty with which they're brought to light."

Her previous films include Castro Cowboy, a short film about the late Marlboro model Christen Haren who died of AIDS in 1996, Joining the Tribe, Married People, and Going to Extremes.  A 1984 honors graduate of Harvard University, Kates worked for several years at Harvard's Kennedy School of Government writing public policy case-studies. She is a former producer of the PBS series Computer Chronicles, and has worked as a producer, writer, and story consultant on various documentary projects. She also speaks frequently at schools, colleges and universities.

Awards

Brother Outsider

Outstanding Documentary. GLAAD Media Awards, 2004
Silver Hugo Award. Chicago International Television Competition, 2004
American Library Association Notable Videos for Adults, 2004
Jury Award for Best Documentary. Icelandic Gay and Lesbian Film Festival, 2004
CINE Golden Eagle, 2003
Audience Award for Best Documentary. 27th San Francisco International Lesbian & Gay Film Festival, 2003
Best Documentary. Cinequest San Jose Film Festival, 2003
Outstanding Documentary Feature (tie). Outfest: Los Angeles Lesbian and Gay Film Festival, 2003
Audience Award for Best Feature. New York Lesbian and Gay Film Festival, 2003
Best Documentary Award. Turin International Gay and Lesbian Film Festival, 2003
Jury Award for Best Documentary. Chicago Gay and Lesbian Film Festival, 2003
Audience Award for Best Documentary. Philadelphia International Gay and Lesbian Film Festival, 2003
First Prize in Documentary. Rhode Island Film Festival, 2003
Jury Award for Best Documentary.  Athens International Film Festival, 2003
Audience Award for Best Documentary. Pittsburgh Lesbian and Gay Film Festival, 2003
Audience Award for Best Documentary. Indianapolis Lesbian and Gay Film Festival, 2003

Their Own Vietnam
Student Academy Award, Documentary.  Academy of Motion Picture Arts and Sciences, 1995
Certificate of Merit. David Wolper/International Documentary Association, 1995
Merit Award. South by Southwest Film Festival, 1996
Emerging Artists Award. Minneapolis/St. Paul International Film Festival, 1996
Second Prize, Documentary. UFVA Film and Video Festival, 1996
Athena Award (for achievement in Lesbian Film), Documentary, 1996
Women’s Programming Award. Humboldt International Film Festival, 1996
Award of Merit. Sinking Creek Film Festival, Nashville, 1996

Castro Cowboy

Director's Choice Award. Black Maria Film Festival, 1993
Judge’s Special Merit Award. New England Film and Video Festival, 1993
Bronze Apple Award. National Educational Film and Video Festival, 1993

Works
Joining the Tribe
Married People
Going to Extremes
Castro Cowboy (1992). 7 minutes
Their Own Vietnam (1995). 23 minutes
Vale of Tears (2002). 4 minutes
Brother Outsider: The Life of Bayard Rustin (2003) 84 minutes

External links
 Regarding Susan Sontag
 Brother Outsider
 Nancy Kates Wordpress Blog
 Nancy Kates IMDB

References

Pittsburgh International Lesbian and Gay Film Festival Records (Pittsburgh International Lesbian and Gay Film Festival Records, 1983-1994, CTC.1994.02, Curtis Theatre Collection, Special Collections Department, University of Pittsburgh)

Year of birth missing (living people)
Living people
Stanford University alumni
American women film directors
Harvard University alumni
21st-century American women